Zbigniew Henrique Morozowicz, known as Henrique de Curitiba (August 29, 1934 in Curitiba, Paraná – February 18, 2008 ), is a Brazilian composer of Polish descent. He chose the pseudonym "Henrique de Curitiba" to become known in Brazil and abroad under a more commonly and better pronounceable name.

Morozowicz was born as son of derivants of Polish emigrants who came to Curitiba in 1873; his father was a dancer and choreographer and was known at La Scala in Milan, Italy. His mother was a pianist which brought little Henrique to music. He graduated at the Curitiba Music and Arts School in 1953 and worked as an organist at the city's cathedral. Morozowicz then moved to São Paulo to study piano under Henry Jolles and composition under H. J. Koellreuter at the Escola Livre de Música. He went to Poland in 1960 for further studies.

In 1981 Morozowicz received the Master's Degree at Cornell University and Ithaca College in New York, under the guidance of Karel Husa. He became a well-known and recognised composer as "Henrique de Curitiba". Morozowicz has composed more than 150 works, amongst them many choral works. He taught at UFPR in the 80's and in the 90's, and at UFG until 2006. 
He died in Curitiba on February 22, 2008.

References

External links 
 90seitiges Scriptum about Morowicz's life and work (PDF file)

1934 births
2008 deaths
Brazilian composers
Brazilian people of Polish descent
Cornell University alumni
Academic staff of the Federal University of Paraná
Academic staff of the Federal University of Goiás
Ithaca College alumni
People from Curitiba